Palo Alto is a 2013 American drama film written and directed by Gia Coppola, based on James Franco's 2010 short story collection of the same name. The film stars Franco alongside Emma Roberts, Jack Kilmer, Nat Wolff and Zoe Levin.

Plot
Teddy and his best friend, Fred, are teenage stoners. At soccer practice April's friends laugh about their coach Mr. B's crush on April. He asks her to babysit his son Michael, and he then offers her the striker position. Fred and Teddy walk to their car talking about what they would do if they got into a drunk driving accident. Teddy says he would drive away even if it was his crush, April.

At a party, Teddy invites April to the graveyard with him and Fred. They hold hands as they run there. She carves a heart into the tree and they bond. Heading back to the party, they drink alcohol with everyone. Teddy goes outside to throw up when Emily takes him to the bathroom to get mouthwash. April sees them head upstairs and becomes jealous.

April starts talking to Ivan, who flirts with her. Teddy and Emily kiss and she performs oral sex on him. Going outside, he becomes upset when he sees April kissing Ivan. He and Fred leave the party, getting into a car accident. Teddy quickly drives away, blaming Fred as he spoke about it earlier. A police officer arrives at Teddy's house and arrests him for driving under the influence. Instead of serving any jail time, Teddy is placed on probation.

April sits by the pool with her friends Chrissy and Shauna. Chrissy tells them that Emily performed fellatio on Teddy, upsetting April. Teddy is ordered to perform community service at a children's library as part of his probation. Emily and her friend sit watching Fred play basketball. He later goes to Emily's, and they have sex.

While Teddy is doing his community service, Fred visits him and draws a penis in a children's book; Teddy later gets in trouble for both this and carving April's name into a bench. Then Fred's father hits on him at Fred's house.

April goes to Mr. B's for help on her history paper. He kisses her and confesses his feelings. Later that night, Teddy and Fred cut down the tree April carved a heart in with a chainsaw. The next day, Fred goes to Emily's. He admits that at a friend's house, he got her naked in the bed so everyone could have sex with her.

April goes to Mr. B's again after he ignored her at soccer practice. She says she does not want to see him anymore, but he claims that he loves her and wants to be with her.

In class, April gets called back for her history paper as her stepfather wrote it. In Teddy's art class, the teacher observes Fred's art and tells him how he went down the "tunnel of death" and realized he is "not Bob" as he drove down the highway.

At a soccer game, April messes up, missing many chances to score. Mr. B offers to drive her home and takes her back to his house. They sit on the couch and begin kissing, and then April loses her virginity to him. The next day, when she is babysitting, Michael tells her he has another babysitter, her teammate Raquel, which upsets her. She tells Mr. B that she does not want to go to his house anymore.

At a party, April goes to sit with Teddy. He says he loves her, confusing her as they do not talk often. Later on, at Skull's to buy weed, Fred tells Skull that Teddy mentioned wanting to cut Skull's heart out, although it was he who suggested it after he brought a knife.

Fred then asks Skull if he had a choice, would he rather be gay or a girl, to which Skull and Teddy make fun of Fred and call him a "faggot". Fred questions why they think it is wrong to be with a man and then explains that being inside a girl means she is the one in control and not the other way around. He then falls to the floor and starts crying. They return to the car, and Fred wants to drive down a one-way road, but Teddy demands to exit. Fred drives down the one-way by himself while repeatedly shouting, "I'm not Bob." April texts Teddy, making them smile as Teddy walks alone.

Cast

Production
Filming took place throughout November and December 2012 in Southern California, and at the homes of Val Kilmer and Gia Coppola's mother.

Release
Palo Alto premiered at the Telluride Film Festival in August 2013 and at the Venice Film Festival in September 2013. The film was shown at the Tribeca Film Festival on April 24, 2014, and at the San Francisco International Film Festival on May 3, 2014. Palo Alto was released in a limited release on May 9, 2014. The film was later released on video on demand on July 29, 2014.

Reception
The film received generally positive reviews; based on 125 reviews, the film carries a 68% rating on review aggregator website Rotten Tomatoes with an average rating of 6.2/10 where the consensus states: "A promising debut for director Gia Coppola, Palo Alto compensates for its drifting plot with solid performances and beautiful cinematography." On Metacritic, the film has a rating of 69 out of 100, based on 34 reviews, signifying "generally favorable reviews".

Ian Freer of Empire gave the film 4 stars out of 5, calling it a "terrific, truthful, portrait of teenage lives, delivered with a naturalness and compassion of which seasoned directors can only dream." He praised the performances, particularly Emma Roberts', who he said "is the standout, heartbreaking as she suggests longings and anxieties without over-hyping it. Much like the film itself." Tom Shone of The Guardian also acclaimed Roberts as the "standout", giving the film 3 stars out of 5. He also lauded Gia Coppola's "eye for cool composition", for posing Roberts against "repetitive, bland, pastel-colored surfaces" until her "pale, luminous beauty pops." However, he felt that away from Roberts, "the film drifts and drags, and some of the image-making is rote."

Soundtrack

The film's soundtrack was released June 3, 2014 through Domino Recording Company.

"Palo Alto" by Devonté Hynes
"Ode to Viceroy" by Mac DeMarco
"Fútbol Americano" by Robert Schwartzman
"Champagne Coast" by Blood Orange
"5FT7" by Tonstartssbandht
"Is This Sound Okay?" by Coconut Records
"Rock Star" (movie version) by Nat & Alex Wolff
"Senza Mamma" by Francesco Pennino
"Graveyard" by Robert Schwartzman
"So Bad" by Robert Schwartzman 
"April's Daydream" by Devonté Hynes
"It's You" by Robert Schwartzman
"T.M." by Jack Kilmer
"You're Not Good Enough" by Blood Orange

References

External links
 
 
 
 

2013 films
2010s high school films
2013 independent films
2010s teen drama films
American high school films
American independent films
American teen drama films
Films based on short fiction
Films set in Palo Alto, California
Films shot in California
American Zoetrope films
2013 directorial debut films
2013 drama films
2010s English-language films
2010s American films